Elena Quinteros (September 9, 1945, in Montevideo –  missing from 1976) was a Uruguayan anarchist and school teacher arrested and killed during the civic-military dictatorship of Uruguay.

On June 26, 1976, Quinteros was detained and taken to the Army's torture centre .

She tried to escape asking for help in the Venezuelan embassy, but she was taken by force. A few days later she was tortured and killed.

The School Nº 181 changed its name to  Elena Quinteros School.

References

1945 births
1976 deaths
Uruguay–Venezuela relations
Uruguayan murder victims
Uruguayan torture victims

Uruguayan anarchists
Murdered anarchists